CBCB may refer to:

 CBCB-FM, a Canadian radio station
 CBCB-TV, a Canadian television station
 Catholic Bishops' Conference of Bangladesh
 Chess Boxing Club Berlin for chess boxing

See also

 2CBCB-NBOMe (NBOMe-TCB-2), a hallucinogen
 
 CB (disambiguation)
 2C-B
 CB2 (disambiguation)